Jinning Township is a rural township in Kinmen, Republic of China. It is in the Taiwan Strait, on the coast of mainland China.

History
In 1913, Sen-you Li founded the Guning Advanced Elementary School.

In October 1949, today's Jinning Township was the site of the Battle of Kuningtou.

Jinning Township was established in 1953.

In 1999, the Kinmen County Government established a horseshoe crab conservation area of about 800 hectares in the tidal flat northwest of Guningtou (Ku-ning-t'ou).

Administrative divisions

Jinning is divided into six rural villages:
 Anmei Village
 Banglin Village (Pang-lin)
 Guning Village
 Houpan Village
 Hupu Village
 Panshan Village

Education
 National Quemoy University

Tourist attractions
 Beishan Broadcasting Wall
 Beishan Old Western-style House
 Chiang Ching-kuo Memorial Hall
 Ci Lake
 Gulongtou Zhenwei Residence
 Guningtou Battle Museum
 Houhu Seashore Park
 Kinmen Peace Memorial Park

Transportation
In the future, Jinning will be connected to Lieyu / Lesser Kinmen by Kinmen Bridge which is currently still under construction.

See also
 List of islands of Taiwan

References